Turuptiana obliqua is a moth in the family Erebidae. It was described by Francis Walker in 1869. It is found in Mexico and Panama.

References

Moths described in 1869
Phaegopterina